Alexander Vincent LoScialpo (born April 29, 1981) is an American actor, writer and sound engineer. He is known for his role as Andy Barclay in the Child's Play franchise, having played the character in Child's Play (1988), Child's Play 2 (1990), Curse of Chucky (2013), Cult of Chucky (2017) and again for the Syfy/USA Network television series Chucky in 2021.

Early life
Vincent was born April 29, 1981, in Newark, New Jersey and raised in Maywood, New Jersey. He graduated in 1999 from Hackensack High School.

Career
At the age of 5, his desire to start acting happened when he saw his neighbor on television, he went to her agent and scored in several commercials. In 1988, he landed the role of Andy Barclay in Child's Play after competing against hundreds in NYC and LA, and ultimately 2 other kids his age. He got the role after refusing to swear in front of his mother while reading some lines. After playing it off like he forgot the lines, he impressed the producers and landed the role.

He is the owner and producer at AV Productions Recording Studio and Production Company in Clearwater, Florida.

Personal life
He graduated from Hackensack High School in 1999.  Vincent also attended Full Sail University in Winter Park, Florida.

Filmography

Film

Television

Crew work
Frost Bite (2012) - Sound designer
House Guest Massacre (2013) - Composer, writer
10 Seconds to Run (2016) - Sound editor, composer
South of Central (2020) - Sound editor (13 episodes)
Koko (2021) - Sound Mixer
Sorority of the Damned (TBA) - Sound

References

External links
 
 

1981 births
Male actors from Newark, New Jersey
American male child actors
American male film actors
American people of Italian descent
Hackensack High School alumni
Living people
People from Maywood, New Jersey
20th-century American male actors
21st-century American male actors